The Boulonnais is a coastal area of northern France, around Calais and Boulogne-sur-Mer. It has a curved belt of chalk downs which run into the sea at both ends, and geologically is the east end of the Weald-Artois Anticline.

Administration 

The Pays Boulonnais is subdivided into 3 intercommunalities: the Communauté d'agglomération du Boulonnais, the Communauté de communes de la Terre des Deux Caps & the Communauté de communes de Desvres - Samer.

Towns and villages of the Boulonnais

See also 
Côte d'Opale
Nausicaä Centre National de la Mer

External links 

Tourism in Boulogne and in the Boulonnais region
Tourism in Pas-de-Calais
Caps et Marais d'Opale Regional Natural Park

Photo gallery

References

Subdivisions of the Pas-de-Calais
Boulogne-sur-Mer